The United States National Climatic Data Center (NCDC), previously known as the National Weather Records Center (NWRC), in Asheville, North Carolina, was the world's largest active archive of weather data.  Starting as a tabulation unit in New Orleans, Louisiana in 1934, the climate records were transferred to Asheville in 1951, becoming named the National Weather Records Center (NWRC).  It was later renamed the National Climatic Data Center, with relocation occurring in 1993.  In 2015, it was merged with the National Geophysical Data Center (NGDC) and the National Oceanic Data Center (NODC) into the National Centers for Environmental Information (NCEI).

History
In 1934, a tabulation unit was established in New Orleans, Louisiana to process past weather records.  Climate records and upper air observations were punched onto cards in 1936.  This organization was transferred to Asheville, North Carolina in 1951, where the National Weather Records Center (NWRC) was established.  It was housed in the Grove Arcade Building in Asheville, North Carolina.  Processing of the climate data was accomplished at Weather Records Processing Centers at Chattanooga, Tennessee, Kansas City, Missouri, and San Francisco, California, until January 1, 1963 when it became consolidated with the NWRC.  This name was maintained by the agency through 1967. The NCDC was then housed at the Veach-Baley Federal Complex in downtown Asheville where it moved after the building's completion in 1995.  In 2015, NCDC merged with the National Geophysical Data Center and the National Oceanographic Data Center to form the National Centers for Environmental Information.

Sources
Data were received from a wide variety of sources, including weather satellites, radar, automated airport weather stations, National Weather Service (NWS) Cooperative Observers, aircraft, ships, radiosondes, wind profilers, rocketsondes, solar radiation networks, and NWS Forecast/Warnings/Analyses Products.

Climate focus
The Center provided historical perspectives on climate which were vital to studies on global climate change, the greenhouse effect, and other environmental issues. The Center stored information essential to industry, agriculture, science, hydrology, transportation, recreation, and engineering. These services are still provided by the NCEI. 

The NCDC stated:
Evidence is mounting that global climate is changing. While it is generally accepted that humans are negatively influencing the climate, the extent to which humans are responsible is still under study. Regardless of the causes, it is essential that a baseline of long-term climate data be compiled; therefore, global data must be acquired, quality controlled, and archived. Working with international institutions such as the International Council of Scientific Unions, the World Data Centers, and the World Meteorological Organization, NCDC develops standards by which data can be exchanged and made accessible.NCDC provides the historical perspective on climate. Through the use of over a hundred years of weather observations, reference data bases are generated. From this knowledge the clientele of NCDC can learn from the past to prepare for a better tomorrow. Wise use of our most valuable natural resource, climate, is the goal of climate researchers, state and regional climate centers, business, and commerce.

Associated entities
NCDC also maintained World Data Center for Meteorology, Asheville. The four World Centers (U.S., Russia, Japan and China) have created a free and open situation in which data and dialogue are exchanged.

NCDC maintained the US Climate Reference Network datasets amongst a vast number of other climate monitoring products.

See also
Climate Prediction Center
Environmental data rescue
National Severe Storms Laboratory
NOAA National Operational Model Archive and Distribution System (NOMADS)
State of the Climate
Storm Prediction Center
50th Anniversary NCDC Booklet - History and Status 2001
https://www.yumpu.com/en/document/read/24253145/2001-the-national-climatic-data-center

References

Climate change organizations based in the United States
Climate change assessment and attribution
Climatic Data Center
Climatic Data Center
Oceanography
Asheville, North Carolina
1934 establishments in Louisiana
2015 disestablishments in North Carolina